The 2018 Balkan Athletics Championships was the 73rd edition of the annual track and field competition for athletes from the Balkans, organised by Balkan Athletics. It was held at Beroe Stadium in Stara Zagora, Bulgaria on 20 and 21 July. It was the fourth time that the city hosted the competition, following the 1985, 2011 and 2013 editions.

Two championship records were broken: Paraskevi Papachristou of Greece set a women's triple jump mark of 14.60 m (+ 1.7 m/s), while Serbia's Marija Vučenović set a women's javelin throw best of 60.60 m. Bulgaria's Inna Eftimova took a women's sprint double in the 100 metres and 200 metres. Florina Pierdevară of Romania was runner-up in both women's middle-distance running events and Bulgarian horizontal jumper Gabriela Petrova also won two individual silvers. Romania was the most successful nation at the competition, topping the medal table with 23 medals (nine of them gold), and were closely followed by Greece on 22 medals and eight golds.

Results

Men

Women

Medal table

References

Results. Balkan Athletics. Retrieved 2019-06-09.

2018
Sport in Stara Zagora
International athletics competitions hosted by Bulgaria
Balkan Athletics Championships
Balkan Athletics Championships
Balkan Athletics Championships